Louis A. Molina (born April 24, 1972) is an American police officer and Commissioner of the New York City Department of Correction. He was formerly the Chief of the City of Las Vegas Department of Public Safety and detective with the New York Police Department.

Early life and education 
Molina was born in New York City in 1972 and grew up in Bronx, New York.  He attended Cathedral Preparatory Seminary, later graduating from Christopher Columbus High School, graduating in 1991.  From there, he served in the United States Marine Corps (1991–1995).  He attended Chaminade University of Honolulu, graduating in 1997 with a bachelor's degree in philosophy.  In 2011, Molina graduated from Marist College School of Management with a master's in public administration and while studying at Marist was awarded a partial scholarship to study at Columbia University Graduate School of Arts and Sciences graduating in 2012 with a master's of arts in human rights studies, and in 2020 received a partial scholarship from Harvard Business School Fund for Leadership & Innovation and completed the Harvard Business School General Management Program.

Career 
Molina began his career as a patrol officer in Manhattan's Upper East Side neighborhood with the New York City Police Department's 19th Precinct in 2000 after graduation from their training academy.  He rose to the rank of detective in the New York Police Department and also served as president of the National Latino Officers Association.

Kings County District Attorney's Office 
The late Brooklyn District Attorney Ken Thompson initially appointed Molina in 2014 as Director of Training for the Office's Detective Investigations Bureau and within a few months was promoted to Deputy Chief Investigator.

New York City Department of Homeless Services 
In August 2015, Molina was hired by former Commissioner of the New York City Department of Homeless Services as a Senior Advisor for security and emergency operations to address public safety issues in and around the vicinity of homeless shelters. New York City Mayor Bill de Blasio and Steven Banks the Commissioner for the Department of Social Services made the decision to hand over shelter security to the New York City Police Department, despite objections made by Molina.  Molina left the Department of Homeless Services.

New York City Department of Correction 
In August 2016, Molina was appointed as the agency's Chief Internal Monitor in accordance with the Nunez Federal Consent Decree. He later was also appointed and served the dual role of Acting Assistant Commissioner of the Department's Nunez Compliance Unit. After the former commissioner's sudden departure Molina competed for the position of commissioner, but was not selected and left the Department. Molina would later go on to Westchester County Department of Correction and successfully navigate Westchester County DOC release from federal oversight.

New York City Taxi & Limousine Commission 
In June 2017, Molina was appointed First Deputy Chief Enforcement Division by the former New York City Chair of the Taxi & Limousine Commission.

Westchester County Department of Correction 
In March 2018, Molina was appointed First Deputy Commissioner for the Westchester County Department of Correction by Westchester County Executive George Latimer, placing Molina second in command of the largest Law Enforcement agency in Westchester County.  While at Westchester County DOC Molina is credited with enhancing education program services for detainees to include college courses. He oversaw the integration of Westchester County Department of Social Service staff to streamline delivery of social service support upon discharge. He led the team that obtained 100% compliance with the 2016 United States Department of Justice settlement agreement, attaining substantial compliance on all the agreement provisions. Westchester County DOC experienced steady declines of Use of Force incidents every year during his tenure with the Department and increased access to justice by working with Legal Aid of Westchester County to open a satellite Legal Aid office inside the jail facility. Molina was recognized by the Criminal Justice Section of the New York State Bar Association with the inaugural Martin B. Adelman Memorial Award for his innovative work and his management of Westchester County DOC during the COVID-19 pandemic.

City of Las Vegas Department of Public Safety 
In January 2021, Molina was appointed Chief of the City of Las Vegas Department of Public Safety, overseeing Deputy City Marshals, City's jail and Animal Control Officers

New York City Corrections Commissioner 
On December 16, 2021, Mayor-Elect Eric Adams appointed Molina, Commissioner of the New York City Department of Correction. He became the first Latino commissioner of the New York City Corrections Department. Upon his announcement, Adams announced that when taking office he would immediately re-institute solitary confinement. It was also noted during Adams' announcement that one of the primary reasons for his appointment was emotional intelligence, something that future appointments will be assessed on.

References 

Living people
American police officers
Marist College alumni
Chaminade University of Honolulu alumni
Columbia Graduate School of Arts and Sciences alumni
Harvard Business School alumni
1972 births

Commissioners in New York City